Rick Fantasia is a Professor in the Social Sciences at Smith College in the United States and Director of its Kahn Liberal Arts Institute. 

He frequently conducts research in France, and his research interests include the interaction between labor and culture in the United States and France. He was particularly influenced by the French sociologist Pierre Bourdieu, and is the former Director of the Louise W. and Edmund J. Kahn Liberal Arts Institute. He received his Ph.D. from the University of Massachusetts Amherst.

Publications
Cultures of Solidarity. Berkeley: The University of California Press, 1988
(co authored with Maurice Isserman) Homelessness: A Sourcebook. New York: Facts on File, Inc., 1994)
(co-editored with Rhonda F. Levine and Scott G. McNall). Bringing Class Back In: Historical and Contemporary Perspectives, Boulder, CO: Westview Press, 1991
(co-authored with Kim Voss) Hard Work: Remaking the American Labor Movement. Berkeley: The University of California Press, 2004. Published in France as Des Syndicats Domestiqués: Répression patronale et résistance syndicale aux États-Unis. Paris: Editions Raisons d’Agir, 2003.
French Gastronomy and the Magic of Americanism. Philadelphia: Temple University Press, 2018. French edition forthcoming from Paris: Editions du Seuil, 2021.

References

External links
Rick Fantasia, Professor & Study Abroad Adviser on Smith College Sociology pages.

Living people
Year of birth missing (living people)
American sociologists
Sociology educators
Smith College faculty
Labor historians